Events from the year 1867 in Russia.

Incumbents
 Monarch – Alexander II

Events

 
 
  
  
 Alaska Purchase
 Berdichev machine-building plant
 Moscow Circus on Tsvetnoy Boulevard

Births

 Richard Hayward 1867-2023

Deaths

References

1867 in Russia
Years of the 19th century in the Russian Empire